The Phantom Stallion books is a series of children's books by American author Terri Farley, first published in 2002 by Avon Books.

The series features Samantha "Sam" Forster, a girl who shares a unique bond with a wild horse named The Phantom Stallion. Having spent two years away from her family's Nevada ranch to recover from a riding accident, Sam returns home to find that things are never easy where horses are concerned.

There are 24 books in the series with one million copies sold worldwide.

Main characters

Samantha Anne "Sam" Forster 
The main character Samantha Anne, usually called "Sam," is the daughter of Louise Forster, who died when Sam was young, and Wyatt Forster. She lives with Wyatt and Grace (Gram). Since a young age Sam has had a special bond with a horse that grew from a black colt named Blackie into the wild gray stallion known as the Phantom. When Sam was younger, she fell off Blackie when he spooked. Sam struck her head in the accident, knocking her unconscious.  Since the accident doctors warned her father Wyatt that Sam could suffer from complications. Although Sam begged not to go, Wyatt sent her to live with her Aunt Sue in San Francisco where she would be safer and also near a hospital. After returning from her two-year stay in California, Sam felt out of place on River Bend Ranch and struggles with this for most of the series. Sam found out that during her absence "Blackie" had become the new herd leader, the Phantom. She connects with the Phantom, which reminds the horse how she used to care for and love him. Sam is known for being stubborn, kindhearted towards animals, loyal to her friends, and doing anything for the horses she loves; these qualities land her in trouble throughout the books. Her natural friend is Jacob (Jake) Ely, and she makes a new friend, Jennifer (Jen) Kenworthy. Sam has auburn hair, brown eyes (though the books also mention her with blue eyes) and is just over five feet tall. She is fourteen, but by the end of the series she has turned fifteen. Sam also loves photography, winning various awards and being an editor for the Darton Dialogue, her high school's newspaper.

Jacob "Jake" Ely 
Always referred to as Jake, unless someone is angry with or teasing him. He is half Shoshone on his father's side.  Arguably Sam's best friend. Jake is known for being shy and trying to explain his thoughts in as few words as possible. He knows a lot about horses and Sam often turns to him for advice about a horse she is dealing with. He is an expert tracker, and wants to work on the police force when he gets older. Jake is sixteen years old, turning seventeen later in the series, and often plays the role of Sam's chauffeur/guardian as he feels very protective of her. When Sam returns home from San Francisco, he tells her that she was hurt last time because he wasn't watching her close enough, and that from now on he was going to "stick to her like glue". He lives on Three Ponies Ranch with his parents and his brothers.

Jennifer Marie "Jen" Kenworthy 
Usually called Jen. Sam's best friend. Jen is intelligent, sarcastic, and possibly a slightly better rider than Sam. She dreams of someday becoming a vet. She strives to keep A's on her report card to earn a scholarship for college because she knows her family won't be able to afford college otherwise. She lives on Gold Dust Ranch, her family's small house in the shadow of Linc Slocum's huge mansion. Although Jen heartily dislikes Linc and Rachel Slocum, she later develops a crush on Ryan Slocum, and they have a flirtatious relationship. Jen was home schooled until middle school. She has white-blonde hair often worn in braids, blue eyes, and wears black-rimmed glasses. She often wears loud clothing which aggravates Jake. Jen and Jake have this never ending rivalry, which often makes sam uncomfortable. Jen dreams of someday owning Gold Dust Ranch, and after Linc is arrested in "Run Away Home", Ryan and the Kenworthys start a working ranch on the same grounds as the Gold Dust with the new name, "Harmony Ranch".

Wyatt Forster
Sam and Cody's overprotective father. Louise's husband, and remarried to Brynna. He is known for being strict and just as stubborn as Sam. Wyatt, much like other cowboys in the series, speaks in as few words as possible.  He's tall and has dark hair and brown eyes. He often rides Strawberry or Jeepers-Creepers, but later in the series Brynna and Sam get him his own horse, named Blue Wings. Blue isn't mentioned very often.

Brynna Olson Forster
Sam's step-mother and Wyatt's second wife. Grace's new daughter-in-law. She works at the Bureau of Land Management and loves wild horses. She's an excellent rider. She has long wavy red hair and blue eyes. She marries Wyatt in the seventh book, and announces her pregnancy in the sixteenth book. In the twenty-fourth book she gives birth to her son Cody. Her horse is Penny, a little sorrel mustang mare who is blind. She is a little worried about fitting in and overdoes her role as a stepmother for Sam causing her too lose her temper at times. Brynna changes much in her life; like Algebra, cleaning her room in 'vacation', banning her from riding, saving wild horses, bringing HARP, ganging with her Dad getting her in trouble, getting new horses ...etc... Sam counts herself lucky that she has a stepmother that loves horses like her.

Cody Forster
Sam's half-brother. He was born in December at River Bend Ranch during a snowstorm in "Run Away Home" while Gram and Wyatt are trapped in town by the storm. Stranded alone at river bend with a labouring Brynna, Sam calls Maxine Ely to come and help. Almost immediately after calling Maxine, the phone line goes down. Together Sam and Maxine help deliver the baby. Cody was an early Christmas present for Sam and her family. Sam thinks Cody is the name of a strong cowboy, and she loves her brother. Cody has red hair and blue eyes like his mother.

Grace Forster (Gram)
Sam and Cody's paternal grandmother, called Gram throughout the series. She is Wyatt's mom. Gram is the bookkeeper of River Bend Ranch, cooks, cleans, and tends her garden. Her favorite horse is a paint mare named Sweetheart, although she hardly ever rides. Grace has lived on the ranch her whole life.  She believes nearly any form of emotional upset can be cured by talking it out over some good food and is renowned for her delicious recipes.  Grace always tags along on the cattle drives, taking a big van out ahead of the hands and setting up "chuck wagon" style meals each day.

Lincoln "Linc" Slocum 
The main antagonist in the series. Linc has a reputation of playing cowboy. He is convinced he can buy his way into anything, and sometimes, it works. The one thing he can't get with money is the Phantom. He uses cruel bits and sharp spurs on his mounts, and wears fancy, expensive clothes that make him look like a Hollywood cowboy. Linc thinks of many schemes to make money and capture the Phantom, trying to prove he's a cowboy and not just a Western-wannabe throughout the entire series. He often uses Champ, a palomino gelding previously owned by the Kenworthys, as a riding horse. He is outsmarted by Brynna and Sam many times. In book 24, "Run Away Home", Linc gets arrested for not paying his taxes. Linc and his wife are divorced.

Rachel Slocum
Linc Slocum's daughter, rich and set on ruining Sam's school life as a freshman, and Ryan's twin sister. Popular and spoiled, Rachel wears fashionable clothes and looks wonderful in everything she wears. She also has a boyfriend names Kris Cameron. She thinks of horses as dumb beasts. Rachel has a slight British accent. As Sam puts it, she's a beautiful witch. Rachel flirts with Jake whenever they are around. Though when she flirts, its to annoy Sam.

Ryan Slocum
Linc's son, and Rachel's twin brother. He has long wavy hair and brown eyes. Ryan likes horses a lot more than his sister. He has a slight British accent, and has come to Nevada from living with his mother in England. He rides English style, and he and Jake tend to be competitive, most likely because Sam and Ryan become good friends, making Jake jealous. Jen has a crush on Ryan since he makes his first appearance in "The Challenger," and at times Ryan seems to return it. In "The Phantom Stallion: Run Away Home" Ryan takes over the ranch after Rachel moves back to England.

Lila Kenworthy
Jen's mother.  She has blonde hair like her daughter, and was once Rodeo Queen. Has a faint Texas accent. Occasionally has a testy relationship with her husband, Jed, and was good friends with Sam's mother, Louise. In several different books, Lila is sometimes called "Leah". However, that is not her name. Phantom Stallion #14: Moonrise is one of the books in which Lila is called "Leah".

Jed Kenworthy
Jen's father who used to own the Diamond K Ranch with his family, until he hit hard times and sold it to Linc Slocum.  He stays on as The Gold Dust Ranch's foreman.  He is sometimes cold and very strict about the way he treats both horses and people, often causing Sam to wonder how Jen can stand him.  This has caused friction between the girls before.  Money troubles and having to work under the Slocums make Jed even angrier, occasionally causing the relationship with his wife Lila to falter.  Despite his gruff exterior, he genuinely loves his wife and daughter.  His greatest wish is to get out from under Slocum's thumb and re-create his "Fire and Ice" Palomino breeding program.  In "Run Away Home," he regains ownership of the ranch and renames it the Harmony Ranch. Jed is friends with Sam's father, Wyatt.

Maxine Ely
Jake's mother, and Sam's history teacher at Darton High. She is blond, petite and rules her household of men. Maxine enjoys photography and has won awards for her photographs. Her favorite thing to photograph is windows. Maxine is good friends with Inez Garcia, the trainer and owner of the famous stunt horse, Bayfire.  In "Run Away Home" when Brynna went into labor Maxine and Sam helped deliver Cody during a snowstorm.

Lucas "Luke" Ely
Jake's father. A full-blooded Shoshone. He owns Three Ponies Ranch and works in a mine.  He's the Chief of the volunteer fire department which includes his sons.

Adam Ely
One of Jake's brothers, who works in Reno at a kayaking outfitter store.

Kit Ely
Eldest of the Ely brothers. After a bronc crushed his wrist "into dust" which resulted in an arm injury Kit ultimately retired from the rodeo and comes back home in "Runaway Home." There is tension between Kit and Jake upon his return. Kit often refers to Jake as 'Baby Bear,' which irritates Jake to no end. Jake is cold to his eldest brother because he is worried Kit is going to take over Three Ponies Ranch, when Jake feels like it should be him. Jake relaxes upon finding out Kit is moving to Hawaii to work on his friends ranch. Their relationship is restored after this. Kit works for Darby's grandfather in "The Phantom Stallion: Wild Horse Island" series.

Macquinn "Quinn" Ely
Quinn is the only Ely brother besides Jake and Kit that plays a fairly large part in the series. He has spiky hair and is on the student council at Darton High.  He enjoys playing pranks on his younger brother Jake. He has a chocolate brown Quarter Horse named Chocolate Chip, who is identical in conformation to his full sister Witch.

Nathaniel "Nate" Ely
Nate is another Ely brother.  All we know about him is that he rides a horse named Digger.

Brian Ely
Yet another Ely brother. Along with Seth Ely, Brian was mentioned only once throughout the entire series. He was mentioned during the fire at River Bend in 'Dark Sunshine.' However, in several books it is said that there are seven Ely brothers: Kit, Nate, Seth, Adam, Brian, Quinn, and Jake Ely.

Seth Ely
A paralegal, studying tribal law at Great Basin College. Has a long braid and wears glasses. Info from Terri Farley's novella, Phantom Stallion; The Protector.

MacArthur "Mac" Ely 
Jake's grandfather, a Shoshone tribal elder.  It is Mac who asks his grandsons to remember their Shoshone heritage by doing various Indian initiation tasks. He appears in "Red Feather Filly," when Jake is asked by his grandfather to remember his heritage. Jake catches and trains a wild filly with the help of his grandfather, and Sam. Jake gets his "mustang eyes" from his grandfather.

Darrell
Jake's best friend and leader of the group at school. Wears baggy clothes and has a bad-boy reputation, but proves that he cares about animals when he rescues Fluffy, a fighting rooster, in "Wild Honey". Also, in "The Renegade", Darrel is shown to be patiently looking after his younger relative when they are at a rodeo, showing that he has a softer side despite his rough exterior. Near the end of the series, Darrell makes a habit of calling Sam darlin', which annoys Jake and Sam who already has to put up with "Brat" even though that doesn't annoy her much as darlin. Sam gets annoyed with him in much the same way that Jake gets annoyed with Jen.

Calliope "Callie" Thurston
Callie has bright blonde hair with a pierced nose, though she often dyes her hair many other colors in the series. Callie goes to Darton High the same school as Sam and Jen. Callie lives by herself in an apartment with a back yard surrounded by barbed wire. Jen thinks that Callie is weird. Sam instantly likes Callie, and they bond over Callie's Mustang mare Queen. In "Desert Dancer" Callie adopts a tiger-striped dun mare who turns out to be the Phantoms lead mare. She names the mare Queen, and they have a special bond that Sam notices instantly.

Aunt Sue
Sam's aunt. Louise's sister. Wyatt's sister-in-law. Lives in San Francisco, California. Sam lived with her for two years after her accident resulting in a brief coma. The series begins as Sam is coming back from living with Sue. Sue is the closest Sam will get to remembering her mother. Like Sam, she loves movies. Sue is a teacher.

Louise Forster
Sam's mom and Wyatt's late wife. Sue's sister and Grace's late daughter-in-law. Louise died in a car accident when Sam was five years old. She swerved to miss a herd of antelope, and her car rolled into a ditch and filled with water, causing her to drown. Heck Ballard, the sheriff, was the first to tell Sam how her mom really died. Sam doesn't remember her mom very well, but she cherishes the memories she has of her.  Wyatt and Gram have told her more and more about her mother as the series progresses and Sam ages. They mentioned how she used to come out and sit by La Charla at night to soothe Sam to sleep when she was pregnant with her, and again when Sam was an infant. Apparently, Louise wasn't much of a cook, but she could make one thing really well and that was lasagna.  Gram insists that she will teach Sam how to make it one day, just like her mother. Louise had long red hair and blue eyes. She was described as a bubbly, happy, and enthusiastic woman. Wyatt even called her some sort of a hippie in one of the books.

Trudy Allen 
Gram's bossy friend. She is the same age as Gram and has black hair and blue eyes. After her husband's death, Mrs. Allen lived like a hermit for a long time, until Sam opened her eyes to see that she still loved mustangs. She saved 14 mustangs from euthanasia due to old age or poor conformation at the BLM while Norman White, Brynna's stand-in replacement, was in charge of the corrals. She now runs the Blind Faith Mustang Sanctuary, along with owning her three saddle horses Judge, Ginger, and Calico. In the 23rd book, she meets Phineas Preston, a retired policeman with salt-and-pepper hair and light blue eyes. At the end of the book, they are engaged.

Alyson "Ally" McClintock
A thin, pale girl with wispy brown hair.  She is in Sam's journalism class and is usually very quiet.  She leads the "Cherubs" at their church, a choir for young children.  Ally befriends Sam in "Blue Wings."  She has problems with her father, who is an alcoholic.  Later in the series, her father is convicted of cockfighting.

The Phantom
The Phantom Stallion is a gray stallion, half Quarter Horse and Half Mustang.
As a colt he lived with humans and was solid black (hence the name Blackie). His original owner was Samantha Anne Forster, but an accident separated them forever and freed The Phantom into the wild. His dam was a sorrel purebred Quarter Horse mare named Princess Kitty, and his sire was Smoke, a purebred wild Mustang stallion.
Now, wild and free, The Phantom still shares a firm bond with Sam.
Unfortunately, The Phantom is hunted by Linc Slocum (a multi-millionaire and a cowboy wannabe), thankfully, The Phantom has the wits to outsmart Linc Slocum, but not without a few scars for life. The Phantom, in the wild, has to not only dodge humans, but cougars, coyotes, and other mustang stallions looking for mares. With Sam's help he lives happily out there, wild and free.

Novels in the series
 The Wild One – (July 2002)
 Mustang Moon – (2002)
 Dark Sunshine – (October 2002)
 The Renegade – (November 2002)
 Free Again – (January 2003)
 The Challenger – (March 2003)
 Desert Dancer – (May 2003)
 Golden Ghost – (July 2003)
 Gift Horse – (October 2003)
 Red Feather Filly – (February 2004)
 Untamed – (April 2004)
 Rain Dance – (July 2004)
 Heartbreak Bronco – (October 2004)
 Moonrise – (February 2005)
 Kidnapped Colt – (April 2005)
 The Wildest Heart – (June 2005)
 Mountain Mare – (September 2005)
 Firefly – (October 2005)
 Secret Star – (January 2006)
 Blue Wings – (February 2006)
 Dawn Runner – (May 2006)
 Wild Honey – (July 2006)
 Gypsy Gold – (September 2006)
 Run Away Home – (December 2006)
There is also another series The Phantom Stallion: Wild Horse Island

References

External links

 The Phantom Stallion

Novel series
American young adult novels
Avon (publisher) books